The Blue Yusef Lateef is an album by multi-instrumentalist Yusef Lateef recorded in 1968 and released on the Atlantic label.

Reception

AllMusic reviewer Thom Jurek stated: "The Blue Yusef Lateef is one wild album. In sound, it is the very best the '60s had to offer in terms of experimentation and accessibility. This is blues you can dance to, but also meditate to and marvel at; a pearl worthy of the price".

Track listing 
All compositions by Yusef Lateef except as indicated.
 "Juba Juba" - 4:23
 "Like It Is" - 7:35
 "Othelia" - 4:37
 "Moon Cup" - 3:18
 "Back Home" - 5:03
 "Get Over, Get Off and Get On" (Hugh Lawson) - 3:46
 "Six Miles Next Door" - 4:46
 "Sun Dog" - 3:05

Personnel 
Yusef Lateef - tenor saxophone, flute, pneumatic flute, shannie (as listed in credits, presumably a shehnai), koto, tambura, scraper, vocals
Blue Mitchell - trumpet
Sonny Red - alto saxophone
Buddy Lucas - harmonica
Hugh Lawson - piano
Kenny Burrell - guitar
Cecil McBee - bass
Bob Cranshaw - electric bass
Roy Brooks - drums
Selwart Clarke, James Tryon - violin (track 2)
Alfred Brown - viola (track 2)
Kermit Moore - cello (track 2)
The Sweet Inspirations - vocal group (tracks 1 & 5)

References 

Yusef Lateef albums
1968 albums
Albums produced by Joel Dorn
Atlantic Records albums